The Estádio Municipal Zinho de Oliveira, known as Zinho de Oliveira, is a football stadium located in Marabá, Pará state. It is the home stadium of Águia de Marabá and Gavião Kyikatejê and holds 5,000 people.

History
Built in the 1960s, the stadium was expanded in 2009, and renovated four years later.

In 2014, with Curuzú and Mangueirão both in maintenance, the stadium hosted a Copa do Brasil match between Paysandu and Coritiba.

References

External links
Futebol Nacional profile
Soccerway profile

Zinho
Multi-purpose stadiums in Brazil
1960s establishments in Brazil